The 1968 Dutch Grand Prix was a Formula One motor race held at the Zandvoort Circuit on 23 June 1968. It was race 5 of 12 in both the 1968 World Championship of Drivers and the 1968 International Cup for Formula One Manufacturers. The 90-lap race was won by Matra driver Jackie Stewart after he started from fifth position. His teammate Jean-Pierre Beltoise finished second and BRM driver Pedro Rodríguez came in third.

Classification

Qualifying

Race

Championship standings after the race

Drivers' Championship standings

Constructors' Championship standings

Note: Only the top five positions are included for both sets of standings.

References

Further reading

External links

Dutch Grand Prix
Dutch Grand Prix
Grand Prix
Dutch Grand Prix